Cumulus congestus clouds, also known as towering cumulus, are a form of cumulus that can be based in the low or middle height ranges. They achieve considerable vertical development in areas of deep, moist convection. They are an intermediate stage between cumulus mediocris and cumulonimbus, sometimes producing showers of snow, rain, or ice pellets. Precipitation that evaporates before reaching the surface is virga.

Description 

Cumulus congestus clouds are characteristic of unstable areas of the atmosphere which are undergoing convection. They are often characterized by sharp outlines and great vertical development. Because they are produced by (and primarily composed of) strong updrafts, they are typically taller than they are wide, and cloud tops can reach , or higher in the tropics.

Cumulus congestus clouds are formed by the development of cumulus mediocris generally, though they can also be formed from altocumulus castellanus or stratocumulus castellanus, which are forms of cumulus castellanus. The congestus species of cloud can only be found in the genus cumulus and is designated as towering cumulus (TCu) by the International Civil Aviation Organization (ICAO). Congestus clouds are capable of producing severe turbulence and showers of moderate to heavy intensity. This species is classified as vertical or multi-étage and is coded CL2 in the synop report. These clouds are usually too large and opaque to have any opacity or pattern-based varieties. Congestus and especially cumulonimbus are hazardous to aviation.

An approaching weather front often brings mid level clouds such as altostratus or altocumulus which when expansive and dense reduces insolation and infringes cumulus from reaching the congestus stage. Occasionally, however, particularly if the air below the mid level cloud is very warm or unstable, some of the cumuli may become congestus and the tops of them may rise above the mid level cloud layer, sometimes resulting in showers ahead of the main rainband. This is often a sign the approaching front contains at least a few cumulonimbi amongst the nimbostratus rain clouds and therefore any rain may be accompanied by thunderstorms.

Cumulus congestus will mature into cumulonimbus calvus under conditions of sufficient instability. This transformation can be seen by the presence of smooth, fibrous, or striated aspects assumed by the cloud's upper part. While all congestus produce showers, this development could produce heavy precipitation.

A flammagenitus cloud, or pyrocumulus, (FgCu or FgCu con) is a rapidly growing convective cloud associated with volcanic eruptions and large-scale fires (typically wildfires). Pyrocumulus congestus may thus form under those special circumstances that can also cause severe turbulence. 

Cumulus congestus can also be associated with fair weather waterspouts forming from rotation at the open water surface being stretched and tightened under their updraft. Landspouts most often form under congestus, as well. Both of these non-mesocyclone associated tornadoes typically dissipate when a more pronounced precipitation shaft forms and the downdraft cuts off this process. In highly sheared environments or within the flanking line of a supercell congestus can rotate and on rare occasions produce mesocyclonic type tornadoes, with waterspouts and landspouts emanating from misocyclones, a related but distinct process.

Turkey tower 
 
Turkey tower is a slang term for a narrow, tall, individual towering cloud from a small cumulus cloud which develops and suddenly falls apart. Sudden development of turkey towers could signify the breaking or weakening of a capping inversion, and an area where these consistently form is an "agitated area", a term that applies to congestus generally.

See also 
 Atmospheric thermodynamics
 Convective instability
 Cumulus castellanus cloud
 Pileus

Bibliography 
 American Meteorological Society - Glossary of Meteorology

References 

Cumulus